Phyllanthus sponiifolius is a species of plant in the family Phyllanthaceae. It is native to Colombia and Ecuador.  Its natural habitat is subtropical or tropical moist montane forests.

References

sponiifolius
Flora of Colombia
Flora of Ecuador
Endangered plants
Taxonomy articles created by Polbot
Taxa named by Johannes Müller Argoviensis
Taxobox binomials not recognized by IUCN